Mark Cronin is an American television producer and writer.

Biography
Cronin grew up in the Philadelphia suburb of Upper Darby, Pennsylvania. He graduated from Upper Darby High School and the University of Pennsylvania. At the former, he earned a degree in Chemical Engineering and was on the cast of the Mask and Wig Club. He spent five years working as an engineer in research and marketing. His first job in entertainment was moonlighting as a freelance joke writer for an Ace Award-winning newsbreak spoof on Nick at Nite called Global Village News.

Cronin switched careers permanently when he joined Howard Stern's nationally syndicated Saturday night television show  The Howard Stern Show as a staff writer in 1991. His responsibilities expanded to include scripting entire episodes, producing celebrity interviews, and producing comedic field pieces. He went on to contribute to Stern's national radio show  and serve as producer/writer on his television and video projects, including Stern's New Year's Rotten Eve pay per view special — the most watched entertainment pay per view event of all time. Cronin also scripted an entire E! Entertainment special for Stern's book, Miss America.

In 1995, he moved to Los Angeles to become head writer for MTV's dating show Singled Out with Chris Hardwick and Jenny McCarthy. He eventually was promoted to show-runner for two seasons. In 1996, he joined the Fox network, supervising production for their first prime-time game show, Big Deal. In 1997, he returned to late night and served as supervising producer for The Keenen Ivory Wayans Show.

In 1997, Cronin founded Mindless Entertainment with then-partner Gary Auerbach, who left the company in 2001. The inspiration for the company name came from Cronin's mother, who called TV "that mindless entertainment". 

Mindless' initial production slate included The X Show and The New Movie Show with Chris Gore for FX; Beat the Geeks for Comedy Central; America's Most Talented Kids for PAX; and Cram and Extreme Dodgeball for GSN.

In 2004, Cronin's Mindless Entertainment teamed up with Cris Abrego's 51 Pictures to form 51 Minds Entertainment — the company that produces VH1's lineup of reality television. Anchored by the "Celebreality" flagship show The Surreal Life, the company went on to create related shows including Strange Love, with Flavor Flav and Brigitte Nielsen;  My Fair Brady with Christopher Knight and Adrianne Curry; The Surreal Life Fame Games; Flavor of Love; I Love New York; and Rock of Love. In 2008, Endemol USA acquired a controlling interest in 51 Minds in a deal reported to be worth upward of $200 million.

In 2013 Cronin produced and created Below Deck for Bravo (which was the channel's highest rated, new show premiere of the year), Ghost Mine for SyFy Channel (which garnered a second season order), Cash Dome Pawn for TruTV, Heroes of Cosplay for SyFy Channel, and Scrubbing In for MTV.

In 2014, Cronin began producing under a new banner, Little Wooden Boat Productions. Under Little Wooden Boat, he became executive producer of Idiotest on Game Show Network and is currently in the development stage for multiple other projects. Idiotest continues to be renewed by GSN and premiered its fourth season, Thursday, January 19, 2017.

As of 2016, Below Deck has had continued success with its audience and has completed four seasons. Season 4 is considered one of Bravo's fastest growing series  and season 5 is set to return to production in 2017.

With Below Deck's popularity, Cronin sold a spin-off show to Bravo called, Below Deck Mediterranean. This series premiered May 3, 2016 and the season's ratings permitted Bravo to renew the show for a second season that premiered in 2017.

Productions
America's Most Smartest Model
America's Most Talented Kids
America's Next Top Zombie Idol
Beat the Geeks
 Below Deck
 Below Deck Mediterranean
Brandy and Ray J: A Family Business
Bret Michaels: Life As I Know It
Bridalplasty
 Cash Dome Pawn
Celebrity Paranormal Project
Charm School
Cram
Daisy of Love
Extreme Dodgeball
Famous Food
Flavor of Love
For the Love of Ray J
Frank the Entertainer in a Basement Affair
 Ghost Mine Season 1 and 2
Gotti's Way
 Heroes of Cosplay
Hurt Bert
Idiotest
I Love Money
I Love New York
La La's Full Court Life
La La's Full Court Wedding
Mario Lopez: Saved By the Baby
Megan Wants a Millionaire
Money Hungry
My Fair Brady
The New Movie Show with Chris Gore
New York Goes to Hollywood
New York Goes to Work
Ochocinco: The Ultimate Catch
Real and Chance: The Legend Hunters
Real Chance of Love
Rock of Love
Rock of Love: Charm School
Strange Love
The Surreal Life
The Surreal Life: Fame Games
Ton of Cash
Ultimate Film Fanatic
Ultimate Zoo
Who Wants to Be Governor of California: The Debating Game
The X Life
The X Show

References

External links
 

Living people
University of Pennsylvania School of Engineering and Applied Science alumni
Year of birth missing (living people)
Television producers from California
American television writers
American male television writers
Place of birth missing (living people)
Writers from Los Angeles
Screenwriters from California